Sabuk-eup (사북읍) is a town in Jeongseon, South Korea.

References

External links
 Official website

Jeongseon County
Towns and townships in Gangwon Province, South Korea